Stadium of Little Sports (Montenegrin and Serbian: Stadion malih sportova Стадион малих спортова) is a multi-purpose stadium in Podgorica, the capital of Montenegro. It is located under the Gorica hill, near the city center. The stadium's total area is 6.686 square meters, and it is owned by the municipality of Podgorica. Stadion malih sportova serves as one of the main concert venues in the city.

Held and scheduled events

References 

Sport in Podgorica
Music venues in Montenegro
Multi-purpose stadiums in Montenegro
Buildings and structures in Podgorica